Martin Ahlgren,  is a Swedish cinematographer.

Early life
Ahlgren was born in Scotland to Swedish parents. The family soon returned to Sweden, where Ahlgren grew up in Stockholm. He later moved to the U.S. and attended the School of Visual Arts in New York City.

Career
After a decade of working on campaigns for major brands around the world and music videos for artists such as The Rolling Stones, Beyoncé, and Kanye West, Ahlgren began working on independent feature films and television series. His credits include films such as The Sunlit Night and series such as House of Cards, Daredevil, Altered Carbon, and The Plot Against America, as well as the Netflix comedy special Aziz Ansari: Buried Alive and the pilot episodes for Blindspot and NOS4A2.

Ahlgren has been a member of the American Society of Cinematographers since 2020.

Filmography

Film

Television

Awards and nominations

References

External links
 
 

Swiss cinematographers
School of Visual Arts alumni
Year of birth missing (living people)
Living people